Rob Newton (born 17 April 1953) is  a former Australian rules footballer who played with Essendon in the Victorian Football League (VFL).

Notes

External links 
		
Rob Newton's profile at Australianfootball.com

Living people
1953 births
Australian rules footballers from Victoria (Australia)
Essendon Football Club players